Tyson Aaron Wheeler (born October 8, 1975) is an American former professional basketball player and a current assistant coach at Brown University. A 5'10" (1.78 m), 165 lb (75 kg) point guard, he played four years at the University of Rhode Island Rams men's basketball team from 1994 to 1998. Along with teammate Cuttino Mobley, Wheeler led the Rams to the Elite Eight in the 1998 NCAA Men's Division I Basketball Tournament.

Professional career
Wheeler was selected with the 18th pick of the 2nd round in the 1998 NBA Draft by the Toronto Raptors. His NBA career consisted of one game with the Denver Nuggets in the lockout-shortened 1999 season, where he scored four points and had two assists in only three minutes of play. He later joined the Quad City Thunder in the Continental Basketball Association (CBA).

He played for the Great Lakes Storm of the CBA during the 2002–03 season and was named to the All-CBA Second Team.

References

External links
College & NBA stats @ basketball-reference.com
Umass Coaching bio

1975 births
Living people
American expatriate basketball people in Canada
American expatriate basketball people in Cyprus
American expatriate basketball people in the Dominican Republic
American expatriate basketball people in France
American expatriate basketball people in Israel
American expatriate basketball people in Italy
American expatriate basketball people in Portugal
American expatriate basketball people in Romania
American expatriate basketball people in Turkey
American men's basketball players
APOEL B.C. players
Basketball coaches from Connecticut
Basketball players from Connecticut
BCM Gravelines players
Bnei Hertzeliya basketball players
CSU Asesoft Ploiești players
Denver Nuggets players
Fairfield Stags men's basketball coaches
UMass Minutemen basketball coaches
Fenerbahçe men's basketball players
Great Lakes Storm players
Le Mans Sarthe Basket players
Lega Basket Serie A players
Pallacanestro Cantù players
Point guards
Quad City Thunder players
Rhode Island Rams men's basketball players
S.L. Benfica basketball players
Sportspeople from New Britain, Connecticut
Teramo Basket players
Toronto Raptors draft picks
Yakima Sun Kings players